The 1995–96 NBA season was the Clippers' 26th season in the National Basketball Association, and their 2nd second in Anaheim. After finishing the previous season with the worst record, the Clippers received the second overall pick in the 1995 NBA draft, and selected Antonio McDyess from the University of Alabama, but soon traded him to the Denver Nuggets in exchange for Brian Williams, Rodney Rogers and top draft pick Brent Barry. With the continued development of Loy Vaught, the Clippers showed some improvement with a 7–5 start to the season, but then suffered a nine-game losing streak afterwards between November and December. The team would again lose nine straight games between January and February, and hold a 16–32 record at the All-Star break, as they played without Williams (strained left arch), Rogers (sprained ankle), Pooh Richardson (calf injury), Malik Sealy (knee and thumb injuries), and Stanley Roberts (ankle) for long stretches during the season due to injuries. The Clippers lost their final four games, and finished last place in the Pacific Division again with a 29–53 record.

Vaught led the team with 16.2 points and 10.1 rebounds per game, while Williams showed improvement, averaging 15.8 points and 7.6 rebounds per game, and finished tied in fifth place in Most Improved Player voting, and sixth man Terry Dehere provided the team with 12.4 points and 4.3 assists per game off the bench. In addition, Richardson averaged 11.7 points and 5.4 assists per game, while Rogers provided with 11.6 points per game, and Sealy contributed 11.5 points per game. Barry provided with 10.1 points per game, and was selected to the NBA All-Rookie Second Team, while off the bench, second-year forward Lamond Murray contributed 8.4 points per game, and Roberts averaged 7.0 points and 3.2 rebounds per game. Barry also won the Slam Dunk Contest during the All-Star Weekend in San Antonio.

Following the season, Williams was released to free agency after only playing just one season with the Clippers, due to the team not being able to agree to his high demanded asking price of a $101 million seven-year contract from the team, who offered him $12 million for three years. Williams spent most of the following season as a free agent before signing with the Chicago Bulls in next April, during the final month of the regular season.

Draft picks

Roster

Roster Notes
 Forward/center Antonio Harvey became the 6th former Laker to play with the crosstown rival Clippers. He was signed by the team on January 3, after being released by the expansion Vancouver Grizzlies.

Regular season

Season standings

z - clinched division title
y - clinched division title
x - clinched playoff spot

Record vs. opponents

Game log

Player statistics

Player Statistics Citation:

Awards, records and milestones

Awards
 Forward/guard Brent Barry won the NBA Slam Dunk Contest.  He is the first Clipper to participate in and win the contest.

Week/Month

All-Star
 Aside from NBA Slam Dunk Contest, Brent Barry also played in The Rookie Game on the  Western Conference Rookies team during NBA All Star Weekend.

Season

Records

Milestones
 Brent Barry is the only caucasian to win the NBA Slam Dunk Contest.

Transactions
The Clippers have been involved in the following transactions during the 1995-96 season.

Re-signed

Trades

Free Agents

Additions

Subtractions

Player Transactions Citation:

See also
 1995-96 NBA season

References

Los Angeles Clippers seasons